Joseph Busnaya, in Syriac Yawsip or Yawsep Būsnāyā (?869–979), was an East Syriac monk and mystic in Upper Mesopotamia. His disciple, John (Yoḥannan) bar Kaldun, wrote his biography and incorporated a chapter on his spiritual teachings. It is an important source for the Christian geography of the Sapna valley in the tenth century and contains a wealth of detail about the lifestyle of East Syriac monks of the period.

Joseph was active in the first half of the tenth century. A native of Beth ʿEdraye, near Mosul, he entered the monastery of Rabban Hormizd and later moved to that of Abraham of Beth Ṣayyare in the ʿAmadiyya district. He founded his own monastery in the village of Inishk, which later had to be moved to the top of a hill to protect it from Kurdish raids.
Joseph became a critic of the bookish learning traditions of the East Syriac church. He was a skilled copyist of Scripture but in his old age he gave up all writing. John took care of his correspondence (in Arabic). Joseph focused on memorizing. According to John, he memorized all of both the Old and New Testaments and the thirty-three volumes of Theodore of Mopsuestia. He claimed to be able to recite a text after reading it five times. Joseph was reputedly 110 years old when he died on 4 September 979, which would put his birth in 869.

Joseph's feast day is celebrated on the sixth Friday of liturgical summer (thirteenth after Pentecost) in the East Syriac calendar. His biography is known from a copy made at the monastery of Mar Eliya in 1055, although copies were also known among the Saint Thomas Christians of India in the 16th century. In the West it was known only from its mention in the catalogue of Abdisho of Nisibis, but in the 19th century it was translated into French by Jean-Baptiste Chabot from a copy of the Mar Eliya manuscript made by Samuel Giamil.

Hagiography
Jean-Baptiste Chabot (ed.), "Vie du moine Rabban Youssef Bousnaya", Revue de l'Orient chrétien 2 (1897), 357–405; 3 (1898), 77–121, 168–190, 292–327, and 458–480; 4 (1899), 380–415; and 5 (1900), 118–143 and 182–200.

Notes

Bibliography

869 births
979 deaths
Year of birth uncertain
10th-century Christian monks
10th-century Christian mystics
Nestorians in the Abbasid Caliphate
Syrian Christian monks
Syrian Christian mystics
Longevity claims